Dustin Hapka (born March 9, 1983) is an American professional stock car racing driver. He has raced in the NASCAR Camping World Truck Series.

Motorsports career results

NASCAR
(key) (Bold – Pole position awarded by qualifying time. Italics – Pole position earned by points standings or practice time. * – Most laps led.)

Camping World Truck Series

ARCA Racing Series
(key) (Bold – Pole position awarded by qualifying time. Italics – Pole position earned by points standings or practice time. * – Most laps led.)

References

External links
 

1983 births
NASCAR drivers
Living people
ARCA Menards Series drivers
Sportspeople from Grand Forks, North Dakota
Racing drivers from North Dakota